The yellow-billed kingfisher (Syma torotoro) is a medium-sized  tree kingfisher.

Taxonomy
Three subspecies are recognised:
Syma torotoro torotoro (Lesson, 1827) found in West Papuan islands, lowland New Guinea, Yapen Island and Aru
S. t. flavirostris (Gould, 1850) found in Cape York Peninsula in northeastern Australia
S. t. ochracea (Rothschild and Hartert, 1901) found in the D'Entrecasteaux Islands of eastern Papua New Guinea

Description 
Its orange colouring and yellow bill are distinctive; it has an orange head and neck with a black nape patch and white throat.  Adult females also have a black crown patch.  The upper mantle is blackish grading to olive green on the back, blue-green on rump and with a blue tail.  The upperwing is dull green-blue with dark olive-black flight feathers.  The underparts are pale orange-grey.  The bill is orange-yellow in adults, dark grey in juveniles.

Distribution and habitat
The yellow-billed kingfisher is widespread throughout lowland New Guinea and the adjacent islands, extending to northern Cape York Peninsula in Australia.  It may be found in rainforest, monsoon forest and along forest edges.

Behaviour

Feeding
The yellow-billed kingfisher is known to prey on large insects, earthworms, and small snakes and lizards. It perches in the low canopy, swaying from side to side, before swooping down to the ground to take its prey.

Breeding
The nest of the yellow-billed kingfisher is usually an excavated chamber in an arboreal termite nest.

Voice
Calls include loud, repeated whistling trills like a postman's whistle, mainly during the breeding season.

Conservation status
With a large range and no evidence of significant decline, the conservation status of this species is assessed as being of Least Concern.

References

 BirdLife International. (2006). Species factsheet: Syma torotoro. Downloaded from http://www.birdlife.org on 14 March 2007.
 Coates, Brian J. (1985). The Birds of Papua New Guinea. Volume 1: Non-Passerines. Dove Publications: Alderley, Queensland. 
 Higgins, P.J. (ed). (1999). Handbook of Australian, New Zealand and Antarctic Birds.  Volume 4: Parrots to Dollarbird. Oxford University Press: Melbourne.

External links

Photos, audio and video of yellow-billed kingfisher from Cornell Lab of Ornithology's Macaulay Library
Recordings of yellow-billed kingfisher from Xeno-canto sound archive

yellow-billed kingfisher
Birds of Cape York Peninsula
yellow-billed kingfisher
Taxa named by René Lesson